Cape San Román (Spanish: Cabo San Román) is a cape located in Paraguaná's northernmost point in Falcón State, Venezuela.

External links 

Geography of Falcón
Headlands of Venezuela
Extreme points of Venezuela